This is a complete chronological bibliography of Francis Bacon.  Many of Bacon's writings were only published after his death in 1626.

Prior to 1625
Notes on the State of Christendom (1582)
Letter of Advice to the Queen (1585–6)
An Advertisement Touching the Controversies of the Church of England (1586–9)
Dumb shows in the Misfortunes of Arthur (1587–8)
A Conference of Pleasure: In Praise of Knowledge, In Praise of Fortitude, In Praise of Love, In Praise of Truth (1592)
Certain Observations made upon a Libel (1592)
Temporis Partus Maximus ('The Greatest Birth of Time'; 1593)
A True Report of the Detestable Treason intended by Dr Roderigo Lopez (1594)
The Device of the Indian Prince : Squire, Hermit, Soldier, Statesman (1594)
Gray's Inn Christmas/New Year Revels: The High and Mighty Prince Henry, Prince of Purpoole (1594–5)
The Honourable Order of the Knights of the Helmet (1595)
The Sussex Speech (1595)
Maxims of the Law (1596)
Essays (1st ed., 1597)
The Colours of Good and Evil (1597)
Meditationes Sacrae (1597)
Declaration of the Practices and Treasons attempted and Committed by the late Earl of Essex (1601)
Valerius Terminus of the Interpretation of Nature (1603)
A Brief Discourse touching the Happy Union of the Kingdoms of England and Scotland (1603)
Cogitations de Natura Rerum ('Thoughts on the Nature of Things', 1604)
Apologie concerning the late Earl of Essex (1604)
Certain Considerations touching the better pacification and Edification of the Church of England (1604)
The Advancement of Learning of the Proficience and Advancement of Learning, Divine and Human (1605)
Temporis Partus Masculus ('The Masculine Birth of Time', 1605)
Filum Labyrinthi sive Formula Inquisitionis (1606)
In Felicem Memoriam Elizabethae ('In Happy Memory of Queen Elizabeth', (1606)
Cogitata et Visa de Interpretatione Naturae ('Thoughts and Conclusions on the Interpretation of Nature', 1607)
Redargiutio Philosophiarum ('The Refutation of Philosophies') (1608)
The Plantation of Ireland (1608–9)
De Sapientia Veterum ('Wisdom of the Ancients', 1609)
Descriptio Globi Intellectualis ('A Description of the Intellectual Globe') (1612)
Thema Coeli ('Theory of the Heavens', 1612)
Essays (2nd edition – 38 essays, 1612)
Charge… touching Duels (1614)
The Masque of Flowers (performed by Gray's Inn before the King at Whitehall to honour the marriage of the Earl of Somerset to Frances Howard, Countess of Essex, 1614)
Instauratio Magna ('Great Instauration', 1620)
Novum Organum ('New Method', 1620)
Historia Naturalis ('Natural History', 1622)
Introduction to six Natural Histories (1622)
Historia Ventorum ('History of Winds', 1622)
History of the Reign of King Henry VII (1622)
Abcedarium Naturae (1622)
De Augmentis Scientiarum  (1623)
Historia Vitae et Mortis ('History of Life and Death', 1623)
Historia Densi et Rari ('History of Density and Rarity', 1623)
Historia Gravis et Levis ('History of Gravity and Levity', 1623)
History of the Sympathy and Antipathy of Things (1623)
History of Sulphur, Salt and Mercury (1623)
A Discourse of a War with Spain (1623)
An Advertisement touching an Holy War (1623)
A Digest of the Laws of England (1623)
Cogitationes de Natura Rerum ('Thoughts on the Nature of Things', 1624)
De Fluxu et Refluxu Maris ('Of the Ebb and Flow of the Sea', 1624)
Essays, or Counsels Civil and Moral (3rd/final edition – 58 essays, 1625)
Apophthegms New and Old (1625)
Translation of Certain Psalms into English Verse (1625)
Revision of De Sapientia Veterum ('Wisdom of the Ancients', 1625)
Inquisitio de Magnete ('Enquiries into Magnetism', 1625)
Topica Inquisitionis de Luce et Lumine ('Topical Inquisitions into Light and Luminosity', 1625)

Posthumous
New Atlantis (1627)
Sylva Sylvarum, or Natural History (1627)
Certain Miscellany Works (1629)
Use of the Law (1629)
Elements of the Common Laws (1629)
Operum Moralium et Civilium (1638)
Dialogum de Bello Sacro (1638)
Cases of Treason (1641)
Confession of Faith (1641)
Speech concerning Naturalisation (1641)
Office of Constables (1641)
Discourse concerning Church Affairs (1641)
An Essay of a King (1642)
The Learned Reading of Sir Francis Bacon (to Gray's Inn) (1642)
Ordinances (1642)
Relation of the Poisoning of Overbury. (1651)
Scripta in Naturali et Universali Philosophia (1653)
Scala Intellectus sive Filum Labyrinthi (1653)
Prodromi sive Anticipationes Philosophiae Secundae (1653)
Cogitationes de Natura Rerum (1653)
De Fluxu et Refluxu Maris (1653)
The Mirror of State and Eloquence (1656)
Opuscula Varia Posthuma, Philosophica, Civilia et Theologia (1658)
Letter of Advice to the Duke of Buckingham (1661)
Charge given for the Verge (1662)
Baconiana, Or Certain Genuine Remains Of Sr. Francis Bacon (1679)
Abcedarium Naturae, or a Metaphysical piece (1679)
Letters and Remains (1734)
Promus (1861)

See also
Works by Francis Bacon

External links

Francis Bacon
Bacon, Francis